The 2003 Pittsburgh Steelers season was the franchise's 71st season as a professional sports franchise and as a member of the National Football League.

Their season began with the team trying to improve on their 10–5–1 record from 2002 in which they lost to the Tennessee Titans in the Divisional round of the playoffs.

With the team suffering through injuries as well as less reliance on the running game than normal, the Steelers stumbled to a 6–10 record, going the entire season without winning consecutive games. Since moving to Heinz Field in 2001, this was the Steelers' first season with a losing record and their first season missing the playoffs. The team's record is tied with that of the 1999 season as the worst for a season under head coach Bill Cowher.

In his final season with the team, linebacker Jason Gildon became the franchise's career sack leader during a game against the Arizona Cardinals on November 9.

Since then, this represents the most recent losing season for the Steelers.

Personnel

Notable additions include Troy Polamalu and Ike Taylor.

Roster

Preseason

Schedule

Regular season

Schedule

Note: Intra-divisional opponents are in bold text.

Game summaries

Week 1

Pittsburgh won their season opener for the first time since 1999.

Week 2

Week 3

Week 4

Week 5

Week 6

Week 8

This was the 1,000th game in Steelers history.

Week 9

Week 10

Week 11

Week 12

The Steelers were the only team in the 2003 season to play on the road following a Monday night road game. The NFL at that time had typically given teams that traveled for a Monday night game either a home game or their bye week the following week. Steelers head coach Bill Cowher objected to the team playing a road game after a Monday night road game. Team president Dan Rooney said that he would not pursue the matter with the NFL, noting that the second game was in Cleveland, only  from Pittsburgh.

Week 13

Week 14

Week 15

Week 16

Week 17

Standings

Honors and awards

References

External links 
 2003 Pittsburgh Steelers season at Pro Football Reference 
 2003 Pittsburgh Steelers season statistics at jt-sw.com 

Pittsburgh Steelers seasons
Pittsburgh Steelers
Pitts